Metropolis Rescore is a soundtrack by The New Pollutants for the silent film Metropolis. The original version of the soundtrack was for the 118-minute, digitally restored version which was released in 2002 by the F. W. Murnau Foundation and Kino International. In 2004 The New Pollutants composed and produced the new soundtrack and premiered it live at the 2005 Adelaide Film Festival.  The live performance featured actor/singer Astrid Pill as vocalist, musician Zoe Barry as cellist, DJ Tr!p on turntables and beats and Benjamin Speed on computer, samples and fx.

In 2011, they remade the soundtrack to match the new 2010 restoration of the film, premiering at that year's Adelaide Film Festival. This version was released as a digital download in 2013.

Track listing

 Metropolis Theme [Opening Titles]
 Shift Change
 Running Race / Eternal Garden
 Maria’s Love Theme [Part 1]
 Moloch
 Joh Frederson’s Theme
 Workers Theme [Part 1]
 Rotwang’s Theme / Futura’s Theme [Creation]
 Workers Theme [Part 2]
 The Catacombs [Part 1]
 The Catacombs [Part 2] / The Tower Of Babel
 The Catacombs [Part 3]
 Maria’s Love Theme [Part 2] / Prelude To Kidnap
 Kidnap Theme [Part 1]
 The Seven Deadly Sins
 Kidnap Theme [Part 2]
 Futura’s Theme [Transformation]
 Yoshiwara / The Seven Deadly Sins [Reprise]
 Corruption Theme
 The Destruction Of Metropolis [The Heart Machine]
 The Destruction Of Metropolis [The Flood]
 Witch Hunt
 Metropolis Theme [Closing Titles]

Reception

The soundtrack has been described as "an infectious and unique approach ranging from Germanic trip hop and lo-fi electronica to unforgettable classical and breathtaking cinematica."
Metropolis has subsequently performed at the Australian Centre for the Moving Image (ACMI), as a part of the 2006 Commonwealth Games Cultural Festival and at the 2006 Revelation Perth International Film Festival. In 2010 the work was performed as part of Concrete Playground at the Sydney Opera House & in 2011 it was performed at Mona Foma, programmed by Brian Ritchie.

References

External links
Metropolis Rescore on Bandcamp
Metropolis Rescore excerpts on YouTube

2005 soundtrack albums
Alternative versions of soundtracks
Metropolis (1927 film)
Science fiction film soundtracks
Drama film soundtracks